Hippoglossoides is a genus of righteye flounders native to the North Pacific and North Atlantic oceans.

Species
There are currently four recognized species in this genus:
 Hippoglossoides dubius Schmidt, 1904 (Flathead flounder)
 Hippoglossoides elassodon Jordan & Gilbert, 1880 (Flathead sole)
 Hippoglossoides platessoides (O. Fabricius, 1780) (American plaice)
 Hippoglossoides robustus Gill & Townsend, 1897 (Bering flounder)

References 

 
Pleuronectidae
Marine fish genera
Taxa named by Carl Moritz Gottsche